Ryan Henry Winslow (born April 30, 1994) is an American football punter who is currently a free agent. He played college football at Pittsburgh.

Early years
Winslow attended and played high school football at La Salle College High School.

College career
Winslow was a member of the Pittsburgh Panthers for five seasons, redshirting as a true freshman. As a redshirt senior, Winslow averaged 44.5 yards on 57 punts and was named first-team All-Atlantic Coast Conference.

Professional career

Chicago Bears
Winslow was signed by the Chicago Bears as an undrafted free agent on April 28, 2018. He was cut by the Bears at the end of training camp on August 31, 2018.

San Diego Fleet
Winslow was signed by the San Diego Fleet of the Alliance of American Football (AAF) after the team's original punter, Australian Sam Irwin-Hill, encountered visa issues and played in the league's first game, punting five times for an average of 44.0 yards. He was cut the following week after Irwin-Hill's visa was approved.

Memphis Express
Winslow was signed by the AAF's Memphis Express on February 27, 2019. He served as the team's punter until the AAF ceased operations, averaging 48.4 yards on 27 punts.

Arizona Cardinals
Winslow was signed by the Arizona Cardinals on May 2, 2019. He was waived at the end of training camp as part of final roster cuts. Winslow was re-signed by the Cardinals to their practice squad on September 24, 2019 following an injury to Andy Lee and promoted to the active roster on September 28. He made his NFL debut the next day against the Seattle Seahawks. He was waived on October 8, 2019. Winslow was signed to a futures contract on December 30, 2019. He was waived on September 4, 2020.

Green Bay Packers
Winslow was signed to the Green Bay Packers' practice squad on December 26, 2020. He was released on January 21, 2021, and re-signed to the practice squad two days later. He signed a reserve/futures contract with the Packers on January 25. He was waived on August 16, 2021.

Arizona Cardinals (second stint)
On August 17, 2021, Winslow was claimed off waivers by the Arizona Cardinals. He was waived on August 30, 2021.

Carolina Panthers
On October 14, 2021, Winslow was signed to the Carolina Panthers practice squad. He was promoted to the active roster on October 19. He was waived on October 26.

Arizona Cardinals (third stint)
On December 23, 2021, Winslow was signed to the Arizona Cardinals practice squad. He was released on December 29.

Washington Football Team
On December 31, 2021, Winslow was signed to the Washington Football Team's practice squad after starter Tress Way contracted COVID-19. Winslow was released on January 4, 2022.

San Francisco 49ers
On January 12, 2022, Winslow was signed to the San Francisco 49ers practice squad. He was released on January 18, 2022.

Chicago Bears (second stint)
Winslow signed a reserve/futures contract with the Bears on February 16, 2022. He was waived on May 17.

NFL career statistics

Regular season

Personal life
Winslow is the son of former Cleveland Browns and New Orleans Saints punter George Winslow.

References

External links
Pittsburgh Panthers bio

1994 births
Living people
American football punters
People from Upper Dublin Township, Pennsylvania
Pittsburgh Panthers football players
Players of American football from Pennsylvania
Carolina Panthers players
Chicago Bears players
Arizona Cardinals players
Green Bay Packers players
Memphis Express (American football) players
San Diego Fleet players
San Francisco 49ers players
Sportspeople from Montgomery County, Pennsylvania
Washington Football Team players